Aşağıdoluca is a village in the Nazımiye District, Tunceli Province, Turkey. The village is populated by Kurds of the Şêx Mehmedan tribe and had a population of 246 in 2021.

The hamlets of Aslanlı, Baştarla, Bayır, Beşağaç Musaliyan, Çayır, Çevlik, Geriş, Hatun, Kale, Karaca, Koç, Ustalar and Yaylı are attached to the village.

References 

Villages in Nazımiye District
Kurdish settlements in Tunceli Province